Rapp Creek is a tributary of Tinicum Creek in Nockamixon Township, Bucks County, Pennsylvania in the United States. Rapp Creek is part of the Delaware River watershed.

Statistics
Rapp Creek was entered into the Geographic Names Information System on 2 August 1979 as identification number 1184658. Rapp Creek and Beaver Creek meet their confluences together at Tinicum Creek's 6.40 river mile.

Course
The headwaters of Rapp Creek rises from an unnamed pond south of Coffman Hill in upper Bucks County and flows into Lake Warren within a few hundred feet. Lake Warren was formed as a result of an earthen dam about 1935 and is owned by the Pennsylvania Fish and Game Commission.
After Lake Warren, Rapp continues generally southeastward for about two-thirds of its length receiving a tributary from the left. Then as it turns to flow to the southeast, it picks up a tributary from the right bank next to a quarry. After a short length it meets Beaver Creek to form Tinicum Creek.

Geology
Appalachian Highlands Division
Piedmont Province
Gettysburg-Newark Lowland Section
Brunswick Formation
Lockatong Formation
Diabase
Rapp Creek begins in a region of diabase, an igneous intrusion rising during the Jurassic and the Triassic which consists of dark and very fine grained labradorite and augite. It then flows into the Lockatong Formation, a sedimentary layer consisting of dark-gray to black argillite, shale, with some limestone and calcareous shale. Shortly before it meets the Tinicum, it passes into the Brunswick Formation, which consists of sedimentary mudstone, siltstone, and shale. Mineralogy includes argillite and hornfels.

Crossings and Bridges

See also
List of rivers of the United States
List of rivers of Pennsylvania
List of Delaware River tributaries

References

Rivers of Bucks County, Pennsylvania
Rivers of Pennsylvania